Whizbang may refer to:
 Whizbang, Oklahoma, a ghost town
 T40 Whizbang, a tank-mounted multiple rocket launcher